Shaqeh (also Romanized as Shāqeh) is a village in Baba Aman Rural District, in the Central District of Bojnord County, North Khorasan Province, Iran. At the 2006 census, its population was 15, in 7 families.

References 

Populated places in Bojnord County